This is a list of 56 genera in the family Gerridae, water striders.

Gerridae genera

 Amemboa Esaki, 1925 g
 Amemboides Polhemus & Andersen, 1984 g
 Aquarius Schellenberg, 1800 i c g b
 Asclepios Distant, 1915 g
 Austrobates Andersen & Weir, 1994 g
 Brachymetra Mayr, 1865 g
 Brachymetroides Andersen, 2000 g
 Calyptobates Polhemus & Polhemus, 1994 g
 Chimarrhometra Bianchi, 1896 g
 Ciliometra Polhemus & Polhemus, 1993 g
 Cretogerris Perrichot, Nel & Néraudeau, 2005 g
 Cryptobates Esaki, 1929 g
 Cylindrobates Wappler & Andersen, 2004 g
 Cylindrostethus Fieber, 1861 g
 Electrobates Andersen & Poinar, 1992 g
 Electrogerris Andersen, 2000 g
 Eobates Drake & Harris, 1934 g
 Eotrechus Kirkaldy, 1902 g
 Eurygerris Hungerford & Matsuda, 1958 g
 Gerris Fabricius, 1794 i c g b
 Gerrisella Poisson, 1940 d
 Gigantometra  (China, 1925) d
 Halobates Eschscholtz, 1822 i c g b
 Iobates Polhemus & Polhemus, 1993 g
 Lathriobates Polhemus, 2004 g
 Limnogonus Stål, 1868 i c g b
 Limnometra Mayr, 1865 g
 Limnoporus Stål, 1868 i c g b
 Lutetiabates Wappler & Andersen, 2004 g
 Metrobates Uhler, 1871 i c g b
 Metrobatopsis Esaki, 1926 g
 Metrocoris Mayr, 1865 g
 Naboandelus Distant, 1910 g
 Neogerris Matsumura, 1913 i c g b
 Onychotrechus Kirkaldy, 1903 g
 Ovatametra Kenaga, 1942 g
 Palaeogerris Andersen, 1998 g
 Pleciobates Esaki, 1930 g
 Potamobates Champion, 1898 g
 Potamometropsis Lundblad, 1933 g
 Pseudohalobates J.Polhemus & D.Polhemus, 1996 g
 Ptilomera Amyot & Serville, 1843 g
 Rhagadotarsus Breddin, 1905 g
 Rhagodotarsus Breddin, 1905 g
 Rheumatobates Bergroth, 1892 i c g b
 Rheumatometroides Hungerford & Matsuda, 1958 g
 Rhyacobates Esaki, 1923 g
 Stenobates Esaki, 1927 g
 Stenobatopsis J.Polhemus & D.Polhemus, 1996 g
 Stygiobates Polhemus & Polhemus, 1993 g
 Succineogerris Andersen, 2000 g
 Tachygerris Drake, 1957 g
 Telmatometra Bergroth, 1908 g
 Telmatometroides J.Polhemus, 1991 g
 Telmatrechus Scudder, 1890 g
 Tenagogerris Stål, 1853 d
 Tenagogonus Stål, 1853 g
 Tenagometra Poisson, 1949 d
 Tenagometrella Poisson, 1958
 Thetibates Polhemus & Polhemus, 1996 g
 Trepobates Uhler, 1883 i c g b

Data sources: i = ITIS, c = Catalogue of Life, g = GBIF, b = Bugguide.net, d = Damgaard et al. 2014

References

Gerridae